Giulia Lazzarini (born 24 March 1934) is an Italian actress.  

Her film credits include Mia Madre and Piazza Fontana: The Italian Conspiracy. Her television credits include La donna di picche and Capitan Fracassa.

In 2015 she won the David di Donatello for Best Supporting Actress and the Golden Ciak for Best Supporting Actress for her role in Mia Madre.

Selected filmography
 Destiny (1951)
 Prisoners of Darkness (1952)
 The Place (2017)

External links
 

1934 births
Italian film actresses
Living people
Place of birth missing (living people)